Tommi Kovanen (born July 15, 1975) is a Finnish former professional ice hockey defenceman.

Career statistics

References

External links

1975 births
Living people
People from Pieksämäki
SHC Fassa players
Finnish ice hockey defencemen
HC Fribourg-Gottéron players
HIFK (ice hockey) players
Jokerit players
JYP Jyväskylä players
KalPa players
KooKoo players
Lukko players
Mikkelin Jukurit players
Lahti Pelicans players
Tappara players
Sportspeople from South Savo